Kate Ashfield (born 28 May 1972) is an English actress, who has appeared in stage, TV and film roles, most famously in her role as Liz in the 2004 zombie comedy Shaun of the Dead. She is the co-writer of the 2017 TV series Born to Kill.

Early life 
Kate Ashfield become born on May 28, 1972, in Birmingham, England. She grew up in a operating-elegance family and attended a complete faculty in Northampton. Her interest in acting started at an early age, and he or she later pursued her passion by studying drama at the Bristol Old Vic Theatre School.

Career 
Kate Ashfield's acting profession started in the Nineties when she landed a function within the popular British tv collection, "The Bill." She continued to seem in numerous tv suggests and movies, consisting of "EastEnders," "Shaun of the Dead," and "Secrets & Lies." Her breakout role came in 1998 when she starred in the severely acclaimed film, "This Year's Love."

In 2004, Ashfield won the Best Actress award at the British Independent Film Awards for her position in the movie "Late Night Shopping." She has also obtained rewards for her performances in "Beyond the Gates," "The Baker," and "Line of Duty." In addition to her paintings on screen, Ashfield has appeared in several stage productions, including "Macbeth" and "The Glass Menagerie."

Filmography
 Princess Caraboo (1994, film) – Ella
 Blasted (1995, stage) – Cate
 Shopping and Fucking (1996, stage) – Lulu
 Soldier Soldier (1996, TV) – Cate Hobbs
 Woyzeck (1997, stage) – Marie
 Closer (1998, stage) – Alice
 Guest House Paradiso (1999, film) – Ms Hardy
 The War Zone (1999, film)
 Watership Down (1999, TV series) – Primrose (Series 1/2 only)
 Storm Damage (2000, TV) – Kay
 The Low Down (2000) – Ruby
 Christie Malry's Own Double-Entry (2000) – Carol
 Late Night Shopping (2001, film) – Jody
 Pure (2002, film) – Helen
 Crime and Punishment (2002, miniseries) – Dounia
 Beyond Borders (2003, film) – Kat
 Pollyanna (2003, film) – Nancy
 Killing Hitler (2003, TV) – Rachel
 This Little Life (2003, TV) – Sadie MacGregor
 The Trouble with Men and Women (2003, TV) – Susie
 Fakers (2004, film) – Eve Evans
 Spivs (2004, film) – Jenny
 Shaun of the Dead (2004, film) – Liz
 The Baker (2007, film) – Rhiannon
 Talk to Me (2007, TV series) – Kelly
 Random Quest (2006, TV) – Ottilie/Kate
 The Best Man (2005, TV – released as Unhitched on US DVD) – Becka
 Secret Smile (2005, TV) – Miranda
 Leave Before the Lights Come On Video – Arctic Monkeys (2006) – Suicidal Lady
 Tsunami: The Aftermath (2006, TV) – Ellen
 The Children (2008 three-part TV drama) – Natasha
 Never Better (2008, TV series) – Anita Merchant
 Collision (2009, five part TV drama) – Ann Stallwood
 The Diary of Anne Frank (2009, five-part TV drama) – Miep Gies
 Agatha Christie's Poirot (2010, TV adaptation of Agatha Christie novel Three Act Tragedy) – Muriel Wills
 7 Lives (2011, film) – Cynthia
 New Tricks (2011, TV series) – Hilary Newell
 Silent Witness (2011, TV drama) –  Chief Inspector Rebecca Woods
 United (2011, TV drama) – Alma George
 Late Bloomers (2011, film) – Giulia
 Byzantium (2012, film) – Gabi
 When the Lights Went Out (2012, film) – Jenny Maynard
 Line of Duty (series 1) (2012, TV series) – Jools Gates
 Midsomer Murders (2013, TV series) – Helen Caxton
 Believe (2013, film) – Helen
 Nymphomaniac (2013, film) – Therapist
 Still (2014, film) – Margaret
 Hangman (2015, film) – Beth Miller
 Secrets and Lies (2015, TV series) – Vanessa Richardson
 Sick of It, (2018, TV series) – Zoe
 Sanditon, (2019, TV drama) – Mary Parker
 A Confession (2019, TV drama) – Yvonne Fulcher
 Life (2020, TV drama) - Rachel
 There’s Always Hope''' (2020, Feature Drama) - Samantha 
 His Dark Materials (2022, TV series) - Atal (voice)

Awards and nominations
She has won three awards out of seven nominations:
2000 BIFA Nominee Best Actress, The Low Down2001 Shooting Stars Award United Kingdom
2001 BIFA Best Actress, Late Night Shopping2003 BIFA Best Actress, This Little Life2004 Royal Television Society Best Female Actor, This Little Life2005 Empire Awards Best British Actress, Shaun of the Dead2018 British Independent Film Award (BIFA) Best Television Drama, Born to Kill''

References

External links
 

1972 births
Living people
Actresses from Birmingham, West Midlands
Alumni of Rose Bruford College
English film actresses
English television actresses
English stage actresses
English voice actresses
People educated at King Edward VI Camp Hill School for Girls
People educated at King Edward VI Five Ways
Actresses from Oldham
20th-century English actresses
21st-century English actresses